Alexandre Filipe Clemente Leitão (known as Alexandre) (born 28 March 1979) is a Portuguese footballer who plays as a midfielder for G.D. Estoril-Praia.

Living people
Portuguese footballers
1979 births
People from Mafra, Portugal
Association football midfielders
Sportspeople from Lisbon District